Efritin.com often simply referred to as Efritin is a classified advertisements website operating in Nigeria. It was formally launched in August 2015 and is owned by Swedish company Saltside Technologies.

Efritin was finally closed down in Nigeria due to mismanagement of funds and high data cost as reported by the CEO, Nils Hammar. This was widely reported in digital and print media houses on 15 January 2017.

References

External links

Online marketplaces of Nigeria
Companies based in Lagos